King of Boys: The Return Of The King is a 2021 7-part limited series directed by Kemi Adetiba. It was released on 27 August 2021 exclusively on Netflix as a sequel to the 2018 Nigerian crime political thriller film, King of Boys. Sola Sobowale and Toni Tones reprise their roles as Eniola Salami with Reminisce, Illbliss, Akin Lewis, Osas Ighodaro and Keppy Ekpenyong also reprising their roles. Additional cast members includes Nse Ikpe-Etim, Richard Mofe Damijo, Efa Iwara, Deyemi Okanlawon and Charly Boy.

Synopsis 
The series follows Eniola Salami’s return after 5 years in exile. Not content with the prospect of a fresh start, she immediately resumes her quest to launder her underworld might into legitimate political power — this time aiming even higher than before.

Cast 
 Sola Sobowale as Eniola Salami
 Toni Tones as Young Eniola Salami
 Reminisce as Makanaki
 Illbliss as Odogwu Malay
 Akin Lewis as Aare Akinwande
 Osas Ighodaro as Sade Bello
 Titi Kuti as Ade Tiger
 Keppy Ekpeyong as President Mumusa
 Nse Ikpe Etim as First Lady Jumoke Randle
 Richard Mofe-Damijo as Reverend Ifeanyi
 Efa Iwara as Dapo Banjo
 Deyemi Okanlawon as Adetola Fashina
 Charly Boy as Odudubariba
 Bimbo Manuel as Mr. Mogaji
 Taiwo Ajai-Lycett as Chief Mrs Randle
 Lord Frank as Tunde Randle
 Lanre Hassan as Iyaloja

Episodes

Production and release 
In September 2020, it was announced that Netflix approved the production of King of Boys 2 as a sequel to the 2018 crime thriller film by Kemi Adetiba and was set to feature the old cast members with some additional cast. It was initially planned as a movie but ended up being made into a television series. A 4-minute teaser of the film was released on 16 September 2020. Filming lasted 3 months and ended on 3 November 2020. The official trailer was released on Monday 16 August 2021. It was released on 27 August 2021 exclusively on Netflix.

Toni Tones used method acting for her role as young Eniola, She had to learn the Yoruba language  as a significant proportion of her lines were in the language. She was tutored by Dele Adetiba.

Reception 
Sola Sobowale received numerous accolades for her acting in the series. In a review for Pulse Nigeria, Precious Nwogu wrote "'The Return of the King' makes good its promise of nostalgia but struggles through some barely sellable subplots and less endearing characters. The main plot following Eniola's governorship race and power tussle with the Randles is convincing, fresh and sufficiently takes its audience through the seven-episode series." A reviewer for Culture Custodian noted that the subplot surrounding Dapo Banjo and his family was "long and overdrawn" while Makanaki's role as a villain was underplayed. The reviewer however concluded that "Ultimately, The Return of the King is worth the wait!" While the reviewer for KemiFilani News praised Adetiba for her use of lights, shadows and angles saying "Ultimately, a great deal of a film’s tone is reflected by its lighting and KOB; the return of the king scored 100%." the Pulse Nigeria reviewer noted that "'The Return of the King' opts for high-key lighting that strips it of mystery." A Daily Trust reviewer noted that the film was dotted with unnecessarily long scenes as is the usual Nollywood fashion. A reviewer for The Cable praised the acting in the series noting that there was "no overacting or underacting" exempting Titi Kuti and Charly Boy. The reviewer also gave KOB praise for the theme and dialogue but gave low ratings for the plot, musical score, visual and sound effects.

References

External links

2021 Nigerian television series debuts
2021 Nigerian television series endings
English-language Netflix original programming
Igbo-language television shows
Yoruba-language television shows
Nigerian drama television series
Sequel television series
Television shows set in Lagos